Oscar Kelly (born 5 February 2007) is a professional footballer currently playing as a forward for Rochdale.

Club career
Kelly made his professional debut for Rochdale in a 2–0 FA Cup loss to Bristol Rovers on 5 November 2022, coming on as a substitute for Devante Rodney. In doing so, he became the third youngest player in Rochdale history, behind Peter Thomas and Kevin dos Santos.

International career
He was called up to the Northern Ireland under-16 squad for a mini tournament in October 2022, playing against Finland and Estonia, scoring against both. He was called up again for the Victory Shield. He has also represented Northern Ireland at under-17 level.

Career statistics
.

Notes

References

2007 births
Living people
English people of Northern Ireland descent
English footballers
Association footballers from Northern Ireland
Northern Ireland youth international footballers
Association football forwards
Association football midfielders
English Football League players
Rochdale A.F.C. players